Finland was represented by 53 athletes at the 2012 European Athletics Championships in Helsinki, Finland.

Medals

Results

Men

Track

Combined

Field

Women

Track

Combined

Field

References

Nations at the 2012 European Athletics Championships
2012
European Athletics Championships